Furusjö is a locality situated in Habo Municipality, Jönköping County, Sweden with 325 inhabitants in 2010.

References

External links

Populated places in Habo Municipality